The following lists events that happened during 2015 in Cuba.

Incumbents
 First Secretary of the Communist Party of Cuba: Raúl Castro
 Second Secretary: José Ramón Machado Ventura
 President of the Council of State: Raúl Castro
 First Vice President: Miguel Díaz-Canel

Events

April
 April 10 - Cuba debuts in the Sumit of the Americas on its seventh edition.

May
 May 29 - Cuba is officially removed from the US State Sponsors of Terrorism list.

References

 
Years of the 21st century in Cuba
Cuba
Cuba
2010s in Cuba